Uperodon mormorata, also known as the Indian dot frog, marbled ramanella, dark-banded frog, and mottled globular frog, is a species of narrow-mouthed frog endemic to the Western Ghats of southwestern India. It was previously placed in the genus Ramanella. It has only been reported from three locations, though locally found in some numbers.

References

External links

mormoratus
Frogs of India
Endemic fauna of the Western Ghats
Amphibians described in 1937
Taxa named by C. R. Narayan Rao